Íngrid Fliter (born September 23, 1973, Buenos Aires) is an Argentinian pianist.  She began her formal piano studies with Elizabeth Westerkamp.  Her first public appearance in recital was at age 11, and she made her concerto debut at the Teatro Colón at age 16.

Music career
In 1992, on the advice of Martha Argerich, Fliter moved to Europe, and continued her studies with Vitalj Margulis at the Hochschule für Musik, Freiburg.  She later was a student with Carlo Bruno in Rome, and with Franco Scala and Boris Petrushansky at the Academy "Incontri col Maestro", Imola.  She has participated in masterclasses with Leon Fleisher, Alexander Lonquich and Louis Lortie.  She also counts  Zoltán Kocsis as a mentor.

Fliter won several competitions in her native Argentina and in Europe, first prize winner at the Cantu International Competition and fourth prize winner at the Ferruccio Busoni Competition in Italy.  In 2000, she was awarded the silver medal at the XIV International Chopin Piano Competition in Warsaw.  Fliter was the fifth recipient of the 2006 Gilmore Artist Award and the first woman to win this award.  She was a New Generation Artist for BBC Radio 3 for the period 2007–2009.

Fliter made her United States debut as the featured soloist on a tour with the Warsaw Philharmonic and Kazimierz Kord in January–February 2002.  Her first concerto appearance with a US orchestra was with the Atlanta Symphony Orchestra in January 2006.

Personal life
Fliter lives in Lake Como, Italy with her husband, clarinetist Anton Dressler.

Discography

References

External links
 Ingrid Fliter's website
 Harrison Parrott agency biography
 BBC Radio 3 New Generation Artists biography

1973 births
Argentine classical pianists
Argentine women pianists
Jewish Argentine musicians
Jewish classical pianists
Living people
People from Buenos Aires
Prize-winners of the Ferruccio Busoni International Piano Competition
Prize-winners of the International Chopin Piano Competition
Women classical pianists
BBC Radio 3 New Generation Artists
20th-century classical pianists
20th-century Argentine musicians
21st-century classical pianists
21st-century Argentine musicians
20th-century women pianists
21st-century women pianists